Matheesha Perera (born 17 June 1991) is a Sri Lankan cricketer. He made his first-class debut for Sri Lanka Police Sports Club in the 2011–12 Premier Trophy on 20 January 2012.

References

External links
 

1991 births
Living people
Sri Lankan cricketers
Kalutara Town Club cricketers
Moors Sports Club cricketers
Nugegoda Sports and Welfare Club cricketers
Sri Lanka Police Sports Club cricketers
Place of birth missing (living people)